The National Rifle Association (NRA) is the governing body for full bore rifle and pistol shooting sports in the United Kingdom. Registered as a United Kingdom charity, its objectives are to "promote and encourage marksmanship throughout the King’s dominions in the interest of defence and the permanence of the volunteer and auxiliary forces, naval, military and air." The formal purposes of the charity are to promote the efficiency of the armed forces of the Crown, or the police, fire and rescue or ambulance services. The National Shooting Centre at Bisley is a wholly-owned subsidiary of the association.

History 
The National Rifle Association was founded in 1859, 12 years before its better known American namesake. The Association was originally based on Wimbledon Common. Its founding aim was to raise the funds for an annual national rifle meeting (now known as the Imperial Meeting) "for the promotion of marksmanship in the interests of Defence of the Realm and permanence of the Volunteer Forces, Navy, Military and Air".

In 1860, Queen Victoria fired the opening shot of the first Imperial Meeting. The Whitworth rifle used and the target can be seen in the Museum of the NRA at Bisley. The Queen also sponsored the Queen's Prize match with a £250 cash prize - worth around £30,000 at 2022 prices. The first winner was 17 year old Edward Ross.

The Imperial Meeting quickly gained significance in high society. In 1878 Edward Walford wrote "These annual gatherings are attended by the élite of fashion, and always include a large number of ladies, who generally evince the greatest interest in the target practice of the various competitors, whether it be for the honour of carrying off the Elcho Shield, the Queen's or the Prince of Wales's Prize, or the shield shot for by our great Public Schools, or the Annual Rifle Match between the Houses of Lords and Commons." Key matches such as the Elcho were significant social occasions on par with The Boat Race. Shooters and officials were often household names, and featured or even caricatured in society publications such as Vanity Fair.

The Association moved from Wimbledon to Bisley Camp in 1890 after encroaching housing development around Wimbledon caused concerns about the ongoing ability to safely operate the ranges. In the same year, Queen Victoria granted the National Rifle Association a royal charter of incorporation.

As a skill-based sport, target shooting became open to women from an early point. Participation was in open competition alongside men rather than separate events, although in practice many clubs refused to accept female members. In 1891, Winifred Leale of the Guernsey Rifle Club became the first woman to compete in an NRA Competition. In 1930, Marjorie Foster became the first woman to win the Sovereign's Prize. A road on Bisley Camp is named in her honour. Female participation was not restricted to the UK - in Australia, the North Queensland Rifle Association is documented as holding ladies' competitions as early as May 1899 (although Australian women were controversially excluded when the Army took control of fullbore rifle clubs in 1903).

In 2019 the Charity Commission gave the association formal regulatory advice when it found the NRA had acted outside its charitable objects when it had promoted civilian recreational shooting. In 2020 the Charity Commission stated that the association had made progress and withdrew the decision in April 2022.

The National Shooting Centre

The National Shooting Centre is a wholly-owned trading subsidiary of the National Rifle Association. Through the NSC, the Association owns the freehold on "Bisley Camp", which covers the built areas including Club Row, other buildings and clubhouses as well as the extensive caravan and camping sites. The Camp area also includes some smaller, self-contained ranges such as Cheylesmore. The larger ranges (Century, Stickledown and Short Siberia) are held on a 99-year lease from the Ministry of Defence. Although these are operated directly by the NSC and are not strictly military ranges, they do utilise the MoD's Pirbright Danger Area (which serves the adjacent barracks and military ranges). Consequently, they remain subject to some MoD rules for civilian use of military ranges.

The original ranges for the NRA's Imperial Meeting were at Wimbledon, but in the late 1880s the National Rifle Association began searching for a new site. In early 1888 it seemed that Cannock Chase was to be selected from several locations under consideration.  However, that plan fell through a few months later, and the other potential venues again put their cases, with the Middlesex Chronicle newspaper suggesting that a large site at Staines was a likely home for "The New Wimbledon". Eventually though, Bisley was selected. The principal ranges used at Bisley today are as originally laid out in 1890 to accommodate modern full-bore rifle shooting.

Museum of the National Rifle Association
The Museum of the NRA opened in 1997, some 90 years after it was first proposed. Located on the first floor of the NRA Headquarters on Bisley Camp, it occupies the former stats offices - which became available after the introduction of computers greatly reduced the desk and filing space required for collating competition results.

A working group of volunteers was formed in 1991. The decision was quickly taken to focus on Association history, rather than being a general firearms museum. As well as housing some of the Association's largest and most unwieldy trophies, the museum contains a reference library and picture gallery, along with exhibits of historic firearms, medals, memorabilia  and shooting equipment. A further study-collection of historic rifles is maintained which are not on display but available to researchers.

See also
 Army Operational Shooting Competition, the British Army's premier shooting competition, based at the National Shooting Centre, Bisley.
 Firearms policy in the United Kingdom
 Gun safety
 List of shooting sports organizations
 Wimbledon Cup, a marksmanship trophy first awarded in 1866 in Wimbledon, and subsequently each year by the NRA of America.

References

Further reading 
 MacDonnell, R. J. (1877), The National Rifle Association: A Sketch of Its History and Progress, 1859–1876
 Martin, John. "The Transformation of Lowland Game Shooting in England and Wales in the Twentieth Century: The Neglected Metamorphosis." International Journal of the History of Sport 29.8 (2012): 1141-1158.
 Osborne, Harvey, and Michael Winstanley. "Rural and urban poaching in Victorian England." Rural History 17.2 (2006): 187–212. online
 Margery Masterson, English Rifles: The Victorian NRA

External links
 
 
 
 

Venues of the 1948 Summer Olympics
Olympic modern pentathlon venues
Olympic shooting venues
Sports governing bodies in the United Kingdom
Rifle associations
Shooting sports in the United Kingdom
Sports organizations established in 1859
1859 establishments in the United Kingdom
Shooting sports organizations
Regions of the International Confederation of Fullbore Rifle Associations
National Rifle Association (United Kingdom)